Apollo and Daphne is a life-sized Baroque marble sculpture by Italian artist Gian Lorenzo Bernini, executed between 1622 and 1625. Housed in the Galleria Borghese in Rome, the work depicts the climax of the story of Apollo and Daphne (Phoebus and Daphne) in Ovid's Metamorphoses.

History

The sculpture was the last of a number of artworks commissioned by Cardinal Scipione Borghese, early in Bernini's career. Apollo and Daphne was commissioned after Borghese had given an earlier work of his patronage, Bernini's The Rape of Proserpina, to Cardinal Ludovico Ludovisi.

Much of the early work was done in 1622–23, but a pause,  possibly to work on Bernini's sculpture of David, interrupted its completion, and Bernini did not finish the work until 1625. The sculpture itself was not moved to the Cardinal's Villa Borghese until September 1625. Bernini did not execute the sculpture by himself; he had help from a member of his workshop, Giuliano Finelli, who undertook the sculpture of the details that show Daphne's conversion from human to tree, such as the bark and branches, as well as her windswept hair. Some historians, however, discount the importance of Finelli's contribution. Apollo and Daphne was finally completed in the fall of 1625, sparking an immediate enthusiastic reception of the work.

Description
While the sculpture may be appreciated from multiple angles, Bernini planned for it to be viewed slightly from the right because the work would have been visible from the doorway where it was located. Viewing the sculpture from this angle allowed the observer to see the reactions of Apollo and Daphne simultaneously, thus understanding the narrative of the story in a single instant, without the need to move position. However, the sculpture was later moved to the middle of the room.

Like Bernini's 1622 sculpture The Rape of Proserpina, Apollo and Daphne has a cartouche with a moral aphorism by Pope Urban VIII. Attributing Christian moral value to a pagan subject was a way of justifying the statue's presence in the Borghese villa.

Iconography

When Phoebus (Apollo), fated by Cupid's love-exciting arrow, sees Daphne, the maiden daughter of Peneus, a river god, he is filled with wonder at her beauty and consumed by desire. But Daphne has been fated by Cupid's love-repelling arrow and denies the love of men. As the Nymph flees he relentlessly chases her—boasting, pleading, and promising everything. When her strength is finally spent she prays to her father Peneus:

Yet Phoebus lost none of his passion for Daphne:

Critical reception
The praise for Apollo and Daphne continued despite the decline of Bernini's reputation after his death.  A French traveler in 1839 commented that the group is "astonishing both for mechanism of art and elaborateness, is full of charm in the ensemble and the details." One 19th-century literary journal considered it the only Bernini work worthy of lasting praise.  Others were less positive. An English travel writer in 1829 noted Bernini's technical skill but added that the sculpture "bears all the want of judgment, taste, and knowledge of that age", going on to criticize the appearance of Apollo for being too like a shepherd and not enough like a god.

More recent historians have been much more positive. Robert Torsten Petersson calls it "an extraordinary masterpiece ... suffused with an energy that works out of the tips of the laurel leaves and Apollo's hand and drapery."

See also
List of works by Gian Lorenzo Bernini

References

Notes

Bibliography

Further reading

 Barolsky, Paul. "Ovid, Bernini, and the Art of Petrification". Arion 13, no. 2 (1 October 2005): 149–162. .
 Bolland, Andrea. "Desiderio and Diletto: Vision, Touch, and the Poetics of Bernini's Apollo and Daphne". The Art Bulletin 82, no. 2 (1 June 2000): 309–330. .
 Kenseth, Joy. "Bernini's Borghese Sculptures: Another View". The Art Bulletin 63, no. 2 (1 June 1981): 191–210. .
 Wilkins, Ann Thomas. "Bernini and Ovid: Expanding the Concept of Metamorphosis". International Journal of the Classical Tradition 6, no. 3 (1 December 2000): 383–408. .

External links
 3D Model of Apollo and Daphne
 Image of Sculpture on Web Gallery of Art
 

1620s sculptures
 
Marble sculptures in Italy
Sculptures by Gian Lorenzo Bernini
Sculptures based on Metamorphoses